Goldring is a surname. Notable people with the surname include:

 Danny Goldring, American film, stage and television actor
 Douglas Goldring (1887–1960), British writer
 Ellen Goldring (21st century), American academic
 Frederick Goldring (1897–after 1959), English amateur photographer, and recorder of churches and historic buildings
 John Goldring (born 1944), English judge
 Mark Goldring (born 1957), chief executive of Oxfam
 Mary Goldring (21st century), British journalist
 Peter Goldring (born 1944), Canadian politician
 Stephen Goldring (1908-1996), American businessman
 Stephen Goldring (cricketer) (born 1932), English cricketer and British Army officer
 William Goldring (businessman) (born 1942/1943), American businessman, chairman of the Sazerac Company
 Winifred Goldring (1888–1971), American paleontologist